Eufernaldia is a genus of moths of the family Crambidae.

Species
Eufernaldia cadarellus (Druce, 1896)
Eufernaldia misgabellus (Druce, 1896)
Eufernaldia panamella Schaus, 1922
Eufernaldia sinaloellus (Schaus, 1922)

References

Ancylolomiini
Crambidae genera
Taxa named by George Duryea Hulst